"The Shepherd on the Rock", D. 965, is a Lied for soprano, clarinet, and piano by Franz Schubert. It was composed in 1828 during the final months of his life.

Lyrics
Of the seven verses, the first four and the last came from the poetry of Wilhelm Müller, while verses five and six were attributed to Helmina von Chézy but were written by Karl August Varnhagen von Ense.

Background
The Lied, Schubert's penultimate composition, was written as a belated response to a request from the operatic soprano Anna Milder-Hauptmann, a friend of Schubert. She had requested a show-piece that would allow her to express a wide range of feelings, and he wrote it as thanks for her attempts to stage one of his operas in Berlin. She received a copy of the score from Schubert's brother Ferdinand in September 1829, and the work was published a year and a half after Schubert's death. Milder sang it for the first time at the House of the Blackheads in Riga on 10 February 1830.

Structure
The Lied has three sections, with clarinet and voice equally challenged. The first, in B-flat major, is warm, as the lonely shepherd on the mountaintop listens to echoes rising from below. The second section grows dark as he expresses grief and loneliness; it starts in G minor, then modulates through A-flat major and A minor to G major. The short last section, returning to B-flat major, anticipates the coming of spring and, with it, rebirth.

Complete text

References

Further reading 
 C. Ahrens: "Schuberts 'Der Hirt auf dem Felsen' D. 965 – Lied, Arie oder 'Duett'?" In: Schubert: Perspektiven 5 (2005), pp. 162–182.

External links
 
 First part of the German lyrics, with translations, lieder.net
 Third part of the German lyrics, with translations, lieder.net
 Complete text, with English translation, beverlysillsonline.com
 Review of recording by Helen Donath, Dieter Klöcker, Klaus Donath; Arts Archives 43054-2 (1981)
 Performance of "Der Hirt auf dem Felsen" on modern instruments by Hyunah Yu (soprano), Alexander Fiterstein (clarinet), and Gilbert Kalish (piano), from the Isabella Stewart Gardner Museum in MP3 format

Songs about shepherds
Lieder composed by Franz Schubert
1828 songs
Chamber music by Franz Schubert
Compositions for clarinet
Compositions by Franz Schubert published posthumously
Compositions in B-flat major